Wahid Yudhi Sulistianto (born 22 August 1972) is an Indonesian judoka. He competed in the men's lightweight event at the 1992 Summer Olympics.

References

1972 births
Living people
Indonesian male judoka
Olympic judoka of Indonesia
Judoka at the 1992 Summer Olympics
Place of birth missing (living people)